Short gastric may refer to:
 Short gastric veins
 Short gastric arteries